Parachronistis maritima is a moth of the family Gelechiidae. It is found in Korea, Japan and the Russian Far East.

The wingspan is about 9.5 mm. The forewings are dark grey. The hindwings are grey.

References

Moths described in 1986
Parachronistis